Drigum Tsenpo was an emperor of Tibet.  According to Tibetan mythology, he was the first king of Tibet to lose his immortality when he angered his stable master, Lo-ngam. Legend states that rulers of Tibet descended from heaven to earth on a cord, and that they were pulled back up when their time came.  Lo-gnam cut the cord, leading to Drigum Tsenpo's death; he thus became the first Tibetan ruler to be buried on earth.

There is a detailed, if rather fabulous, account of his life in the Old Tibetan Chronicle.

Footnotes

References
 Bacot, Thomas and Toussaint. (1940-1946). Documents de Touen-houang relatifs a l'histoire de Tibet. J. Bacot, F. W. Thomas, Ch. Touissant. Paris. Libraire orientaliste Paul Geunther.

Tibetan emperors
Tibetan people